Jatt & Juliet is an Indian Punjabi-language romantic comedy film directed by Anurag Singh and produced by Darshan Singh Grewal and Gunbir Singh Sidhu. The film stars Diljit Dosanjh opposite Neeru Bajwa. It was released to theaters on 29 June 2012. Upon release, the film became a massive blockbuster at the box office and also won multiple awards at the PTC Punjabi Film Awards 2013 including Best Film, Best Director, Best Actor and Best Actress. The film also spawned a sequel the following year, titled Jatt & Juliet 2 featuring most of the same cast and crew. The sequel also broke records at the box office, and ended up becoming the highest-grossing Punjabi film ever. It was remade in Bengali in 2014 as Bangali Babu English Mem.

Plot
Fateh Singh, an Indian villager is crazy about marrying a Canadian girl to get Canadian citizenship, while on the other side Pooja, a classy modern girl, wants to go to Canada to study fashion design. They both first meet at the passport office where Fateh asks Pooja to fill his form because his hand was injured, which he was pretending because of his lack of English. They both again meet at the airport.

Pooja and Fateh often quarrel due to Fateh's lies. Pooja looks for a nice accommodation where she finds a nice house and while getting money out of the ATM, she is robbed by two thugs. Unfortunately, Pooja has to look for a cheaper place where she meets Fateh again and has to share that apartment with him. A day arrives when Jenny, a Canadian Caucasian girl, arrives at the house where Pooja and Fateh are living as she is the step-daughter of the house owner. Pooja asks Fateh to propose to Jenny and they both start making plans how to get Jenny for Fateh, but when Fateh learns that Jenny is going to Africa for social service, he ditches her and poor Jenny is left heartbroken. The owner of the house throws both of them out and they work at two different Apna Chulha restaurants that are run by wife and husband, who are not together now. Fateh and Pooja soon discover that the Apna Chulha is going to be re-possessed by the bank because of six unpaid property payments for the loan. Fateh and Pooja work out the process of re-joining the husband and wife together so that the loan could be paid off. Slowly, Fateh and Pooja start falling for each other but both of them don't want to admit it. Fateh realises that he loves Pooja when Pooja's fiancé, Yuvraj comes to take Pooja with him to India for their marriage. Finally Fateh leaves for India with a hope to bring Pooja back to his life but after watching Pooja has been married he is left heart broken. After a while, he meets Yuvraj who tells him about the story of the split between him and Pooja and says that Pooja is still single and Fateh runs to propose Pooja and they live happily ever after.

Cast
 Diljit Dosanjh as Fateh Singh
 Neeru Bajwa as Pooja
 Upasana Singh as Channo
 Jaswinder Bhalla as Joginder Singh
 Rana Ranbir as Shampy
 Sari Mercer as Jennifer (Jenny)
 Karamjit Anmol as Natha
 B.N. Sharma as Shampy's father
 Anita Kailey as Jaswinder (Jazzy)
 Amrinder Gill as Yuvraj Singh (guest appearance)
 Isha Rikhi as Twinkle, Yuvraj's wife
 Lakhwinder Sandhu as Bhola (Lakhwinder Singh)
 Balinder Johal as the Kathy (landlord)
 Anita Devgan as Fateh's mother
 Amrit Billa as Fateh's father
 Tarsem Paul as Pooja's father
 Sunita Dheer as Pooja's mother

Box office

Jatt & Juliet collected Rs 8 million on its first day in Punjab and Rs 22.7 million in its opening weekend. It set a record for the first week box office by collecting of Rs 47 million (Rs 43 million East Punjab + Rs 4 million Delhi/UP) and in its second weekend it collected Rs 20 million plus to become the highest grossing Punjabi Film with a collection of Rs 67.5 million in just 10 days! After four weeks of release it has grossed a total of Rs 108 million from the East Punjab territory, which is the 3rd highest total in that territory in the history of Indian Cinema, only behind Shah Rukh Khan's Ra.One and Don 2. The total 4-week collection for Jatt and Juliet in India was approximately Rs 121 million and the film ultimately grossed an estimated 200 million throughout India.

International
 Punjab: Rs 125 million (5-week total)
 Delhi/UP: Rs 15 million (5-week total)
 UK: Rs 12.9 million (7-week total)
 Australia: Rs 27 million (4-week total)
 New Zealand: Rs 3 million (3-week total)

Sequel

In September 2012 it was announced that there would be a sequel to Jatt & Juliet, entitled simply Jatt & Juliet 2. The movie marks the first time a Punjabi film has had a sequel made. The film was released on 28 June 2013 and was featuring much of the same cast, including of Diljit Dosanjh as Fateh Singh and Neeru Bajwa as Pooja and crew of the first film. The theatrical trailer released on 23 May 2013. It smashed all box office records of that time. The film received rave reviews from the critics as well.

Bollywood remake
Himesh Reshammiya purchased the remake rights of the movie. It will star Manish Paul and Sunny Leone in lead roles.

Bengali remake
In Bengali, it was remade into Bangali Babu English Mem, starring Soham Chakraborty and Mimi Chakraborty, was directed by Ravi Kinnagi and produced by Shree Venkatesh Films.

2013 PTC Punjabi Film Awards

Jatt & Juliet won seven awards at the PTC Punjabi Film Awards in 2013.

Soundtrack

Track listing

References

External links 
 
 

2012 films
Punjabi-language Indian films
2010s Punjabi-language films
Indian romantic comedy films
Films scored by Jatinder Shah
Punjabi films remade in other languages
Films directed by Anurag Singh
Films set in Canada
2012 romantic comedy films